The 2020–21 Coupe de France preliminary rounds, Pays de la Loire was the qualifying competition to decide which teams from the leagues of the Pays de la Loire region of France took part in the main competition from the seventh round.

A total of nine teams qualified from the Pays de la Loire preliminary rounds. In 2019–20, FC Challans and Sablé FC progressed furthest in the main competition, reaching the ninth round before losing to Angoulême-Soyaux Charente (3–1) and Pau (on penalties) respectively.

Schedule
A total of 522 teams entered from the region. The draw, made on 22 July 2020, required a preliminary round on 23 August 2020. This round featured 300 clubs from the district divisions, with a small number of District 1 teams exempted to the first round. The first round, which saw the Régional 3 teams enter, took place on 30 August 2020. The second round, featuring the entrance of the Régional 2 teams, took place on 6 September 2020.

The third round draw, in which the Regional 1 and Championnat National 3 teamas joined the competition, was made on 10 September 2020. The fourth round draw, which saw the Championnat National 2 teams enter, was made on 23 September 2020. The fifth round draw, which saw the entry of the three Championnat National teams from the region, was made on 7 October 2020. The sixth round draw was made on 21 October 2020.

Preliminary round
These matches were played on 22 and 23 August 2020.

First round
These matches were played on 30 August, 2 September and 13 September 2020.

Second round
These matches were played on 5, 6 and 13 September 2020, with two postponed to 20 September 2020.

Third round
These matches were played on 19 and 20 September 2020, with six postponed until 27 September.

Fourth round
These matches were played on 3 and 4 October 2020, with five postponed to 10, 11 and 14 October 2020.

Fifth round
These matches were played on 17 and 18 October 2020, with five postponed to 24 and 25 October and two postponed to 31 January 2021.

Sixth round
These matches were played on 30 and 31 January 2021, with two postponed to 6 and 7 February 2021.

References

Preliminary rounds